Saint Rose of Lima Catholic Church in Gaithersburg is a parish of the Roman Catholic Church in Maryland in the United States. It falls under the jurisdiction of the Archdiocese of Washington and its archbishop. It is named after Saint Rose of Lima of Peru. Mass is held in both English and Spanish.

Pastors and administrators 
 Rev. Joseph Byron, Pastor – June 1972 to June 1983
 Msgr. Robert Lewis, Pastor – June 1983 to Nov. 1983
 Rev. Raymond Fecteau, Administrator – Nov. 1983 to Jan. 1984
 Rev. Francis Murphy, Pastor – Jan. 1984 to June 1985
 Rev. John Vail, Administrator – July 1985 to March 1986
 Rev. Robert Duggan, Pastor – March 1986 to July 2005
 Msgr. Paul Dudziak, Pastor – July 2005 to October 2012
 Msgr. Paul Langsfeld, Pastor – October 2012 to March 2014
 Rev. Agustin Mateo Ayala, Pastor – March 2014 to present

External links 
 

Roman Catholic Archdiocese of Washington
Roman Catholic churches in Maryland
Buildings and structures in Gaithersburg, Maryland
Churches in Montgomery County, Maryland